Al Walideya is an Egyptian football club based in Asyut, Egypt.
They are currently playing in Egyptian Second Division Group A.

References

Football clubs in Egypt
Sports clubs in Egypt